Margaret Sarah Carpenter (née Geddes; 1793 – 13 November 1872) was an English painter. Noted in her time, she mostly painted portraits in the manner of Sir Thomas Lawrence. She was a close friend of Richard Parkes Bonington.

Early life
Carpenter was born in Salisbury, the daughter of Captain Alexander Geddes, who was of an Edinburgh family, and Harriet Easton. She was taught art by a local drawing-master. Her first art studies were made from the pictures at Longford Castle, belonging to the Earl of Radnor.

Career

In 1812, one of Carpenter's copies of the head of a boy was awarded a medal by the Society of Arts, who awarded her another medal in 1813, and a gold medal in 1814. She went to London in 1814, and soon established her reputation as a fashionable portrait painter. She exhibited a portrait of Lord Folkestone at the Royal Academy in 1814, and a picture entitled 'The Fortune Teller' at the British Institution. She exhibited regularly at the Royal Academy between 1818 and 1866. Her painting The Lacemaker was on display at the 1857 Manchester Art Treasures exhibition. She also exhibited at the British Institution and at the Suffolk Street Gallery.

Of Carpenter's Head of a Polish Jew, exhibited at the British Institution in 1823, a reviewer wrote: "It very rarely happens that a specimen of art like this is produced from the hand of a lady: Here are colour, light, strength and effect, and anatomical drawing". The painting was bought for 45 guineas by the Marquess of Stafford, an influential art patrons, who had previously bought her medal-winning painting of 1813. In December 2013 the picture resurfaced at auction (with some fire damage) and was purchased by a family relative for restoration.

Among Carpenter's exhibited portraits were those of Sir H. Bunbury (1822), Lady Denbigh (1831), and Lady King (better known as Ada Lovelace) (1835). Her last work was a portrait of Dr. Whewell. Three of her works are in the National Portrait Gallery collection in London, including portraits of her husband, Bonington and the sculptor John Gibson. There are also several 'leaving portraits' by her in the collection at Eton College. Her portrait of 'The 2nd Lord de Tabley in Academic Robes' hangs in the dining room at Tabley House. There is also one of her portraits at Frewen College, of Helen Louisa Frewen and her son Edward. Her "Portrait of a Lady" hangs in the Neill-Cochran House Museum in Austin, Texas.

Her portraits follow in the tradition of Lawrence, but Wood found them to be more fanciful and feminine character, particularly in her portraits of children.

Family
In 1817, she married William Hookham Carpenter, Keeper of Prints and Drawings at the British Museum. Their children included two noted painters, another William and Percy Carpenter, who both travelled. She introduced her sister Harriet to the young painter William Collins. They eventually married, making Margaret the aunt to Wilkie Collins, novelist and friend to Charles Dickens. On her husband's death in 1866, she was given an annual pension of £100 by Queen Victoria. This award was partly based on her husband's service, but also in recognition of her own artistic merits.

She died in London on 13 November 1872, in her 80th year, and was buried with her husband on the western side of Highgate Cemetery. The grave (plot no.14768) no longer has a headstone. Their daughter Henrietta was buried in the same grave in 1895.

See also

English women painters from the early 19th century who exhibited at the Royal Academy of Art also included
Sophie Gengembre Anderson
Joanna Mary Boyce
Emily Mary Osborn
Rolinda Sharples
Rebecca Solomon
Elizabeth Emma Soyer
Isabelle de Steiger
Henrietta Ward

Notes

References
The Art Journal, 1873 p. 6
Bryan, Michael, Dictionary of Painters and Engravers, 1903
Clayton, E. C., English Female Artist, Volume 1 p. 386, 1876
Ormond, R., Early Victorian Portraits, HMSO, 2 vols, 1973
Redgrave, Samuel, A Dictionary of Artists of the English School, 1878
Shaw Sparrow, W., Women Painters of the World, pp. 60, 66, 96. 100, 1905

External links

National Portrait Gallery - Margaret Sarah Carpenter (née Geddes)

1793 births
1872 deaths
19th-century English women artists
19th-century English painters
Burials at Highgate Cemetery
English people of Scottish descent
English portrait painters
English women painters
People from Salisbury
Principal Painters in Ordinary